Bill Lowrey may refer to:
 Bill G. Lowrey (1862–1947), U.S. Representative

See also
William Lowry (1884–1949), Irish MP
William Lowrie (1857–1933), Australian agricultural educator